What Every Girl Should Know is an album recorded by Doris Day in December, 1959 and issued by Columbia Records on March 21, 1960 as catalog number CS-8234. Doris Day was backed by Harry Zimmerman's Orchestra.

The album was combined with Day's 1961 album, I Have Dreamed, on a compact disc, issued in 2001.

Track listing
The tracks on the album were:

Personnel
 Doris Day - vocals
 Harry Zimmerman - conductor
 Ted Coconis - artwork

References

1959 albums
Doris Day albums
Columbia Records albums